Alejandra Perales (born ) is a Mexican female volleyball player. She is part of the Mexico women's national volleyball team.

She participated in the 2014 FIVB Volleyball World Grand Prix.
On club level she played for NUEVO LEON in 2014.

References

External links
 Profile at FIVB.org
https://web.archive.org/web/20140519025426/http://dezaguero.com/2013/10/04/rumbo-al-mundial-sub23-alejandra-perales/

1992 births
Living people
Mexican women's volleyball players
Place of birth missing (living people)